Liesl Theron is a South African trans activist and the founder of Gender DynamiX organisation.

Personal life 
Theron was born in South Africa to an Afrikaans speaking family and has a two and a half years younger sister.

In 1992, she came out as a lesbian at the age of 20. Her mother struggled with her sexually at first, but later wrote a book about her coming to terms with it.

As of 2011 and 2012, she was in relationship with photographer Zanele Muholi.

Career 
Theron is the founder of Gender DynamiX trans rights advocacy organisation 

Theron supported Sasha, one South Africa's first openly trans refugees navigate entry into South Africa.

In 2016, she received the Global Transgender Heroes award from the True Colors Fund.

Selected publications 

 Liesl Theron, Mariam Armisen, and John McAllister Where do we go from here?: A call for critical reflection on queer/LGBTIA+ activism in Africa, Pambazuka News, 2016
 Sherwood, J., Lankiewicz, E., Castellanos, E., O’Connor, N., Theron, L., & Restar, A. Assessing inclusion of trans people in HIV national strategic plans: a review of 60 high HIV prevalence countries. Journal of the International AIDS Society, [s. l.], v. 24, n. 11, p. 1, 2021. DOI 10.1002/jia2.25837
 Liesl Theron and Ricki Kgositau, The Emergency of a Grassroots African Trans Archive, Transgender Studies Quarterly 2(4): 578-583, 2015

References

External links 

 Gender DynamiX official website

Living people
South African lesbians
South African women activists
Organization founders
South African LGBT rights activists
Year of birth missing (living people)
1970s births
Transgender rights activists
21st-century South African women